Chocolate malt can refer to:
 Chocolate malt, a mash ingredient
 Malted milk
 Milkshake